Lyric Street Records was an American country music record label. It was owned by the Disney Music Group and founded in 1997 by Randy Goodman. The label had its first successes in 1998 with singles by Lari White and Aaron Tippin, both formerly of RCA Records. Other artists who recorded for the label included SHeDAISY and the label's most successful act, Rascal Flatts. A subsidiary label, Carolwood Records, existed between 2008 and 2009. Lyric Street Records was closed in 2010, with most of the former acts moving to other labels or exiting music entirely.

History
President Randy Goodman, formerly a general manager for RCA Records, founded the original unnamed label in June 1997 as a division of Hollywood Records and started operations on August 1. Its first act was Lari White, who was formerly signed with RCA. Aaron Tippin, also then with RCA, and Violets, originally performing as the Osborne Sisters, were also in discussions about signing with the label as of December 1997. Goodman's plan for the company includes having no in-house producers and rely on Artists and repertoire division.

SHeDAISY signed to the label in 1999 followed by Rascal Flatts. Rascal Flatts debuted with Lyric Street in 2000 with the single "Prayin' for Daylight" and soon replaced SheDAISY as the company's flagship act.  In December 2006, Lyric Street signed Bucky Covington, an American Idol finalist.

The label launched a subsidiary label, Carolwood Records, in October 2008.  Jessica Andrews was the first artist signed to this subsidiary label, followed by Trent Tomlinson (who was formerly signed to Lyric Street proper) and Love and Theft. Carolwood was shuttered in November 2009, with most of its staff being transferred back to Lyric Street. Love and Theft, Ruby Summer, Trent Tomlinson, and The Parks were moved to Lyric Street.

On April 14, 2010, Disney Music Group announced the closure of the Lyric Street label. This announcement also stated that Bucky Covington, Kevin Fowler, Tyler Dickerson, and Rascal Flatts would be transferred to other branches of Disney Music Group. Buxton, Love and Theft, and The Parks were dropped altogether with the closure of Lyric. By August, Rascal Flatts had transferred to Big Machine Records. In 2011, Love and Theft moved to RCA Nashville.

Artists

Nate Barrett
John Berry
Sarah Buxton
Shane Caldwell
Bucky Covington
Billy Ray Cyrus
Kevin Denney
Tyler Dickerson
Kevin Fowler
Ashley Gearing
Josh Gracin
Kerry Harvick
Sonya Isaacs
Kortney Kayle
Love and Theft 
Marcel
Brian McComas
The Parks 
Rascal Flatts
Ragsdale
Rushlow
Deric Ruttan
Sawyer Brown
Lisa Shaffer
SHeDAISY
Phil Stacey
Ruby Summer 
Aaron Tippin
Trent Tomlinson 
Chuck Wagon and the Wheels
Lari White
Dave Wilson

Artists on Carolwood

Jessica Andrews
Love and Theft 
The Parks
Ruby Summer
Trent Tomlinson

See also 
 List of record labels

References

External links
 Official site

American country music record labels
Record labels established in 1997
Defunct record labels of the United States
American independent record labels
Record labels disestablished in 2010
Disney Music Group